The BRP Jose Loor Sr. (PC-390) is the nineteenth ship of the  coastal patrol craft of the Philippine Navy. She was commissioned in 1997, and is currently in active service with the Littoral Combat Force, Philippine Fleet.

It was initially designated as Fast Patrol Craft, and was numbered "DF-390", but later on was re-designated as a Patrol Gunboat, and was finally re-numbered as "PG-390". Another round of reclassification was made in April 2016, which re-designated the patrol gunboat as the coastal patrol craft "PC-390".

Technical Details
The ship was built to U.S. Coast Guard standards with aluminum hull and superstructure.

The ship originally designed to carry one bow Mk.3 40 mm gun, one 81 mm  mortar aft, and four 12.7 mm/50 caliber machine guns. Instead, she is armed with only four M2HB Browning 12.7 mm/50 caliber machine guns on Mk.26 mounts, with two positioned forward and two aft; and two M60 7.62 mm/30 caliber machine guns, both mounted amidships. The ship can carry 4,000 rounds of 12.7 mm and 2,000 rounds of 7.62 mm. A large "Big Eyes" binocular is also carried on tripod mounts, one on the forecastle and one just above the mast.

As part of the first batch (PG-370 to PG-378), it is not equipped with Mk.38 Mod.0 M242 Bushmaster 25mm chain gun that her other sister ships carry. It was planned to install either a stabilized or unstabilized M242 25 mm Bushmaster chain gun on her bow after some minor modifications, but as of to date has not materialized.

She is equipped with a Raytheon AN/SPS-64(V)11 surface search and navigation radar but with a smaller antenna as those used in bigger Philippine Navy ships.

A 4-meter rigid inflatable boat powered by a 40-hp outboard motor is stowed amidships.

Footnotes

References

External links
 Philippine Navy Official website
 Philippine Fleet Official Website
 Philippine Defense Forum

Patrol vessels of the Philippine Navy